
Gmina Jonkowo is a rural gmina (administrative district) in Olsztyn County, Warmian-Masurian Voivodeship, in northern Poland.

Villages
Gmina Jonkowo contains the villages and settlements of Bałąg, Gamerki Małe, Gamerki Wielkie, Garzewko, Giedajty, Godki, Gutkowo, Jonkowo, Kajny, Łomy, Mątki, Nowe Kawkowo, Polejki, Porbady, Pupki, Stare Kawkowo, Stękiny, Szałstry, Szelągowo, Warkały, Węgajty, Wilimowo and Wołowno.

Neighbouring gminas
Gmina Jonkowo is bordered by the city of Olsztyn and by the gminas of Dywity, Gietrzwałd, Łukta and Świątki.

References
Polish official population figures 2006

Jonkowo
Olsztyn County